The Ministry for Foreign Affairs (MFA) is a ministry in the Finnish Government and is responsible for preparing and implementing the government's foreign policy.

Organisation

The ministry in 2017 has a total budget of 1.079 billion euros, of which 675 million will be spent on development cooperation and 248 million euros on the ministry's operating expenses. Upkeep of crisis management troops will cost 50 million euros and civilian personnel 15 million.

It employs 1,420 people (of whom approximately 74% are women) as well as 980 locally hired personnel and maintains 89 overseas offices housing foreign missions. Since 1987 the ministry has been concentrated in the Katajanokka district of Helsinki.

Two ministers in the current Sanna Marin's government have portfolios relating to the ministry:

 Minister for Foreign Affairs, who is in overall political control of the ministry
 Minister for Foreign Trade and Development

The most senior civil servant is the Secretary of State, and is assisted by four Under-Secretaries of State with responsibilities allocated as follows:

 Administrative, Legal and Protocol Affairs
 Foreign and Security Policy, Communications and Culture
 External Economic Affairs
 International Development Cooperation and Development Policy

Below these, the ministry is divided into twelve departments:

 Political Department
 Department for External Economic Relations
 Department for Development Policy 
 Department for Europe
 Department for Russia, Eastern Europe and Central Asia; 
 Department for the Americas and Asia; 
 Department for Africa and the Middle East. 
 Department for Global Affairs
 Legal Department
 Department for Administrative Affairs
 Department for Communication and Culture
 Protocol Department

Outside of these departments there are two specialised units:
 Unit for Internal Auditing
 Unit for Policy Planning and Research

Current Ministers 

The ministers, as of 6 June 2019, are:

Minister for Foreign and European Affairs - Pekka Haavisto
Minister for Foreign Trade and Development - Ville Skinnari

The current Secretary of State at the Ministry for Foreign Affairs is Matti Anttonen.

See also 

Foreign relations of Finland
Minister for Foreign Affairs (Finland)

References

External links
 ThisisFINLAND (Department for Communication and Culture)

 
Government of Finland
Foreign
Foreign relations of Finland
Finland